The broad-headed skink or broadhead skink (Plestiodon laticeps) is species of lizard, endemic to the southeastern United States. The broadhead skink occurs in sympatry with the five-lined skink (Plestiodon fasciatus) and Southeastern five-lined skink (Plestiodon inexpectatus) in forest of the Southeastern United States. All three species are phenotypically similar throughout much of their development and were considered a single species prior to the mid-1930s.

Description

The broad-headed skink gets its name from the wide jaws, giving the head a triangular appearance. Adult males are brown or olive brown in color and have bright orange heads during the mating season in spring. Females have five light stripes running down the back and the tail, similar to the Five-lined Skink. However, they can be distinguished by having five labial scales around the mouth, whereas Five-lined skinks have only four. Juveniles are dark brown or black and also striped and have blue tails.

Habitat
Broad-headed skinks are semi-arboreal lizards that are strongly associated with live oak trees. It does not appear that the lizards have a preference for tree size, rather they prefer trees with holes. Juveniles stay closer to the ground on low or fallen branches. Males have been known to guard preferred trees that are surrounded with dense brushes to limit attack by predators and harbor prey. Dead and decaying trees are important habitat resources for nesting.

Behavior
Broad-headed skinks are the most arboreal of the North American Plestiodon. They forage on the ground, but also easily and often climb trees for shelter, to sleep, or to search for food. Broad-headed skinks often feed on what are called "hidden prey"; prey items that can only be located by searching under debris, soil or litter.
Broad-headed skinks are preyed on by a variety of organisms including carnivorous birds, larger reptiles, and mammals. Skinks prefer to flee by climbing a nearby tree or seeking shelter under foliage. These skinks exhibit tail autotomy when caught by a predator. The tails break away and continue to move, distracting the predator and allowing the skink to flee. When consuming large invertebrates, they often carry them to shelter to avoid being preyed upon during the prey handling time.

Reproduction
Males typically are larger than females. The larger the female, the more eggs she will lay. Males thus often try to mate with the largest female they can find, and they sometimes engage in severe fights with other males over access to a female. Females will also mate with the largest males they can find, a result of the Good Genes Hypothesis. Females emit a pheromone from glands in the base of the tail when they are sexually receptive and males can find them by tracking their chemical trails through tongue-flicking. Males show higher tongue flicking rates when exposed to conspecific females verses heterospecific females when mating and will terminate behavioral interaction without initiating courtship if the pheromones do not match the species. The female lays between 8 and 22 eggs, which she guards and protects until they hatch in June or July. Female broadhead skinks will lay their clutch in decaying log cavities, and they have been observed to create a sort of nest by packing down debris within their cavities.

Geographic range
Broad-headed skinks are widely distributed in the southeastern states of the United States, from the East Coast to Kansas and eastern Texas and from Ohio to the Gulf Coast.

Nonvenomous
These skinks (along with the similar Plestiodon fasciatus) are sometimes wrongly thought to be venomous. Broad-headed skinks are nonvenomous.

See also
Gilbert's Skink - similar morphology

Notes

Further reading
Behler, J.L., and F.W. King. 1979. The Audubon Society Field Guide to North American Reptiles and Amphibians. Knopf. New York. 743 pp. (Eumeces laticeps, pp. 573–574 + Plates 424, 431.)
Conant, R. 1975. A Field Guide to Reptiles and Amphibians of Eastern North America, Second Edition. Houghton Mifflin. Boston. xviii + 429 pp.  (hardcover),  (paperback). (Eumeces laticeps, pp. 123–124, Figures 26-27 + Plate 19 + Map 76.)
Schneider, J.G. 1801. Historiae Amphibiorum naturalis et literariae continens...Scincos... Frommann. Jena. vi + 364 pp. + Plates I.- II. (Scincus laticeps, pp. 189–190.)
Smith, H.M., and E.D. Brodie, Jr. 1982. Reptiles of North America: A Guide to Field Identification. Golden Press. New York. 240 pp. . (Eumeces laticeps, pp. 76–77.)

External links

Plestiodon
Reptiles of the United States
Endemic fauna of the United States
Fauna of the Southeastern United States
Fauna of the Eastern United States
Reptiles described in 1801
Taxa named by Johann Gottlob Theaenus Schneider